Malleostemon nerrenensis is a plant species of the family Myrtaceae endemic to Western Australia.

It is found in a small area in the Mid West region of Western Australia to the south east of Shark Bay where it grows in sandy soils.

References

nerrenensis
Flora of Western Australia
Plants described in 2016
Taxa named by Barbara Lynette Rye
Taxa named by Malcolm Eric Trudgen